Rosemary Blight is an Australian film producer, credited with films such as The Sapphires (world premiere at the 2012 Cannes Film Festival and AACTA Award for Best Film), The Tree (closed the 2010 Cannes Film Festival), and Clubland (featured at the Sundance Film Festival). Her television work includes the Lockie Leonard series. She has been principal partner and company director with Goalpost Pictures since 1992, and a board member of Screen Australia since 2013.

Early life
Blight has a degree in communications from Macquarie University.

Career
Blight began her career working for record companies and producing music videos. Her first film was Kay Pavlou's short The Killing of Angelo Tsakos, which led to her securing a job with independent producer John Maynard. Blight founded RB Films in 1991 with partner Ben Grant.

RB Films became Goalpost Pictures in 2008. Its four principals are Rosemary Blight, Ben Grant, Kylie du Fresne and Cass O'Connor. Goalpost Pictures was named Media Super Production Business of the Year at the annual Screen Producers Australia Awards. Goalpost Pictures has an alliance with Goalpost Film in the UK, the international sales company run by Tristan Whalley.

 Blight sits on the Board of Screen Australia.

In July 2021 Blight, along with actor and filmmaker Wayne Blair and Australian producers Darren Dale and Kylie du Fresne, were invited to join the Academy of Motion Picture Arts and Sciences.

Notable films
Blight's most successful film to date has been The Sapphires, which was in Official Selection at the 2012 Cannes Film Festival and released in the US by The Weinstein Company. The film earned more than $14 million at the local box office, sold more than 400,000 DVDs, and won multiple awards.
The Eternity Man won the Rose d'Or (Golden Rose) in 2009.
Clubland, starring Brenda Blethyn and directed by Cherie Nowlan, screened at the Sundance Film Festival and was released by Warner Independent Pictures in the US as Introducing the Dwights.
The Tree, directed by Julie Bertuccelli and starring Charlotte Gainsbourg, was closing night film of the 2010 Cannes Film Festival, and received a standing ovation.

Films
Her films include the following:

See also
 Cinema of Australia

References

External links 
 
 AFTERS Video Rosemary Blight
 Official Facebook
 Official LinkedIn
 YouTube Rosemary Blight and Kylie Du Fresne chat about how THE SAPPHIRES came to be.

Living people
Australian film producers
Australian television producers
Australian women television producers
People from Sydney
Australian women film producers
Macquarie University alumni
Year of birth missing (living people)